The men's 500 metres speed skating competition of the 2014 Sochi Olympics was held at Adler Arena Skating Center on 10 February 2014. Michel Mulder won the gold medal.

Qualification
A total of forty speed skaters could qualify for this distance, with a maximum of four skaters per country. The top 20 of the men's 500 metres World Cup standings after World Cup 4 in Berlin secured a spot for their country. Then the additional 20 spots were awarded based on a time ranking of all times skated in the World Cup and the 2014 World Sprint Speed Skating Championships. A reserve list was also made.

Competition schedule
All times are (UTC+4).

Records
Prior to this competition, the existing world and Olympic records were as follows.

500 meters (1 race)

500 meters x 2 (2 races)

At the 2013 World Single Distance Speed Skating Championships the track records were set by Jan Smeekens at 34.80 (single race) and by Mo Tae-bum at 69.760 (combination).

The following records were set during this competition.

TR = track record

Results

The races were held at 17:00 and 18:55.

TR = track record, DNS = did not start

References

Men's speed skating at the 2014 Winter Olympics